"Like I Do" is a song that was first released in 1962 by Nancy Sinatra. The melody is an adaptation, by Dick Manning, of Amilcare Ponchielli's Dance of the Hours from La Gioconda. The song reached No. 2 in Italy, No. 4 in the Netherlands, No. 6 in Japan, and No. 8 in South Africa.

Later in 1962, Maureen Evans released a version of "Like I Do", which spent 18 weeks on the UK's Record Retailer chart, peaking at No. 3, while reaching No. 5 in Ireland, and No. 7 on New Zealand's "Lever Hit Parade".

In December 1962, Japanese pop duo The Peanuts released a version of the song, which was titled in Japanese "Lemon No Kiss". The song retained a small portion of the song's original English language lyrics, but the Japanese lyrics, written by Minami Kazumi, were completely different.

Teresa Brewer released a version of the song titled "She'll Never, Never Love You (Like I Do)" in 1963. Brewer's version reached No. 122 on Billboards "Bubbling Under the Hot 100" and No. 13 on Cash Boxs "Looking Ahead" chart of singles with potential of entering the Cash Box Top 100.

Chart performance
Nancy Sinatra version

Maureen Evans version

References

1962 songs
1962 singles
Nancy Sinatra songs
Teresa Brewer songs
Philips Records singles
Reprise Records singles
Songs written by Dick Manning